The tallest building in Los Angeles, California is the Wilshire Grand Center, which is  tall and became the city's tallest building in 2017. It is also the tallest building in the state, the tallest building in the U.S. west of the Mississippi River, as well as the 15th-tallest building in the U.S. overall. Seven of the ten tallest buildings in California are located in Los Angeles.

The 73-story U.S. Bank Tower, which rises  in Downtown Los Angeles and was completed in 1989, is now the second-tallest building in Los Angeles.

The building, originally constructed as a commercial structure, has since been renovated into a residential tower and is now known as the "Continental Building".

This effectively limited the height of non-government buildings to 13 stories, and was intended to address local concerns about growing congestion and over development at the time. That height limit was lifted in Downtown Los Angeles by the city government in 1957.

Los Angeles (and especially downtown) then went through a large building boom that lasted from the early 1960s to the early 1990s, during which time the city saw the completion of 23 of its 30 tallest buildings, including the U.S. Bank Tower, the Aon Center, and Two California Plaza. Modern skyscrapers are difficult and expensive to construct in Los Angeles, as well as the resulting difficulty of adhering to the city's rigorous engineering standards. Nevertheless, a number of successful and iconic skyscrapers dot the Los Angeles skyline from Downtown Los Angeles (DTLA) through Koreatown, along the Wilshire Corridor and Miracle Mile, in addition to Century City and other areas of the city's west side. Other skyscraper hubs in Los Angeles include Century Boulevard by Los Angeles International Airport (LAX), the Hollywood district in central Los Angeles, as well as Warner Center, Encino and Universal City in the San Fernando Valley. Los Angeles's west side has so many skyscrapers, often Wilshire Boulevard in the Westwood District and Century City's skyscrapers are confused with being DTLA by visitors arriving from LAX.

Its skyline is ranked first in the Pacific coast region and fifth in the United States, after New York City, Chicago, Miami and Houston.



Tallest buildings

Buildings in the height range. 

This includes spires and architectural details but does not include antenna masts. An equal sign (=) following a rank indicates the same height between two or more buildings. The "Year" column indicates the year a building was completed.

Under construction buildings
This lists buildings that are under construction in Los Angeles and are planned to rise at least .

Approved and proposed buildings
This list is of buildings approved or proposed over  throughout the city.

Timeline of tallest buildings

This lists buildings that once held the title of tallest building in Los Angeles.

See also

Architecture of Los Angeles
List of sites of interest in the Los Angeles area – non-tall famous structures
List of tallest buildings in California

Notes

References

External links
 Diagram of Los Angeles skyscrapers on SkyscraperPage
 Emporis.com – Los Angeles

 01
Lists of tallest buildings in California
Los Angeles
Buildings